Bishop Moore Vidyapith is a Church of South India high school in Kayamkulam, Kerala, India.

History
The school was established in 1995, named after Edward Moore. It started under the roof of an old hospital building in Krishnapuram, Kayamkulam. The school is one among the many institutions that are set by his name including those in Mavelikara and Cherthala.

Organisation
It comprises two educational blocks: a science block, an office block and external facilities. The school is run by the Governing Council, presently headed by Thomas K Oommen. The current principal is Anna Cheriyan and the Current Bursar is Shaji M Johnson.

Curriculum
The Vidyapith is a government-recognised educational Institution. The school is affiliated to the Council for the Indian School Certificate Examinations, New Delhi, and prepares the students for the Indian Certificate of Secondary Education examination at 12th year.

Extra-curricular activities
Facilities are provided for extra-curricular activities. Educational tours are provided for every batch once in every academic year at a cost and seminars and other classes are conducted periodically every year.

See also
 Madhya Kerala Diocese of the Church of South India

References

External links

Church of South India schools
Christian schools in Kerala
High schools and secondary schools in Kerala
Private schools in Kerala
Schools in Alappuzha district
Educational institutions established in 1995
1995 establishments in Kerala